Ensemble!, officially Ensemble – Movement for a Leftist, Ecologist, and Solidary Alternative, is a French left-wing political party, defining itself as anti-capitalist, anti-racist, feminist and eco-socialist. It was launched in November 2013 by several smaller groupings.

History 
The  (Fédération pour une Alternative Sociale et Ecologique, FASE), a group formed in 2008, including many former members of the French Communist Party, and including the association Communistes Unitaires.

The membership of Ensemble is thus made up of activists coming from various left-wing and radical political traditions: altercommunist, trotskyist, feminist, "red-green", ecologist, etc., as well as trade unionists and global justice activists (alterglobalists).

Paid-up membership in June 2015 was approximately 1,200 (internal sources), with several hundred sympathisers.

The movement is a member of the Left Front (French: Front de Gauche), which also includes the French Communist Party and the Left Party (French: (Parti de Gauche)). The candidate of the Left Front, Jean-Luc Mélenchon of the Left Party, obtained 11.1% of the votes in the first round of the 2012 French presidential election.

Ensemble aims towards strengthening the Left Front by building a broad movement against austerity. It opposes all forms of inequality, racism, and oppression, including homophobia, islamophobia, and antisemitism, and seeks to develop links with anti-capitalist groupings outside the Left Front, including more left-wing members of Europe Ecology - The Greens (French: Europe Ecologie-Les Verts). Internationally, it has been involved in discussions and joint activities with the Party of the European Left, Podemos (Spain), Syriza (Greece), Sinn Féin (Ireland), the Left Bloc (Portugal), and others.

Ensemble was formally constituted at a conference held 31 January-1 February 2015 in Saint-Denis (Seine-Saint-Denis). Considering that the merger process had been successfully completed, most of its founding groups then decided to dissolve themselves.

A national delegate meeting takes place in principle 3 times per year. A national coordinating committee ("Equipe d'Animation Nationale, EAN") meets weekly. Its spokespersons include Myriam Martin, Clémentine Autain and Jean-François Pellissier.

Two former Members of Parliament, Jacqueline Fraysse and François Asensi, both former communists who left the French Communist Party in 2010, were, until it was dissolved in 2015, members of the FASE, one of the original constituent groups of Ensemble. An unknown number of local elected officials (including Mayors) and councillors are also members or associates of Ensemble.

Philippe Marlière, professor of political science at University College London, and a long-standing member of the French Socialist Party, and later of the New Anticapitalist Party, joined Ensemble in February 2015.

The headquarters of the movement is in Bagnolet (Seine-Saint-Denis), near Paris.

Ensemble! has a website which is regularly updated, and publishes bulletins, leaflets, and occasional brochures. Members of the movement are free to publish articles on the website, using a blog facility.

The movement holds an annual summer school (French: 'université d'été') in August. The first was held in Pau, with approximately 300 participants. The second took place at the university of Bordeaux from 22 to 26 August 2015, attracting approximately 420 participants.

References

2013 establishments in France
Party of the European Left
Political movements in France
Political parties established in 2013
Socialist parties in France